The 2017–18 Nemzeti Bajnokság II (also known as 2017–18 Merkantil Bank Liga) was Hungary's 67th season of the Nemzeti Bajnokság II, the second tier of the Hungarian football league system.

On 19 June 2017, it was announced that the Hungarian Football Federation accepted all of the licenses of the 2017–18 Nemzeti Bajnokság II clubs.

Team changes

Stadiums by capacity

Stadiums by locations

Personnel and kits

Managerial changes

League table

Number of teams by counties

See also
 2017–18 Magyar Kupa
 2017–18 Nemzeti Bajnokság I
 2017–18 Nemzeti Bajnokság III
 2017–18 Megyei Bajnokság I

References

External links
  
  

Nemzeti Bajnokság II seasons
2017–18 in Hungarian football
Hun